Ivanovka is a rural locality in Nizhnemedveditsky Selsoviet Rural Settlement, Kursky District, Kursk Oblast, Russia. Population:

Geography 
The village is located on the Bolshaya Kuritsa River (a right tributary of the Seym River), 102 km from the Russia–Ukraine border, 26 km north-west of Kursk, 11 km from the selsoviet center – Verkhnyaya Medveditsa.

 Climate
Ivanovka has a warm-summer humid continental climate (Dfb in the Köppen climate classification).

Transport 
Ivanovka is located 3 km from the federal route  Crimea Highway (a part of the European route ), on the road of intermunicipal significance  ("Crimea Highway" – 1st Shemyakino – Ivanovka), 20 km from the nearest railway halt 521 km (railway line Oryol – Kursk).

The rural locality is situated 27 km from Kursk Vostochny Airport, 149 km from Belgorod International Airport and 220 km from Voronezh Peter the Great Airport.

References

Notes

Sources

Rural localities in Kursky District, Kursk Oblast